Pablo Javier Frontini (born 3 May 1984 in Buenos Aires) is an Argentine football coach and former player who played as a defender. He is the current manager of All Boys.

Career

Club career
Frontini started his playing career with River Plate in 2003, he only made three league appearances for the club before joining Instituto de Córdoba in 2006. He then had a season with Gimnasia de Jujuy before joining San Martín de San Juan in 2007. In July 2010 he signed a contract with Anorthosis Famagusta.

Coaching career
Retiring at the end of 2019, Frontini was appointed head coach of his last club, Club Atlético San Telmo, on 4 January 2020.

Statistics 
As of 28 September 2010.

References

External links
 
 Argentine Primera statistics  
 
 Football-Lineups player profile

1983 births
Living people
Footballers from Buenos Aires
Argentine footballers
Argentine expatriate footballers
Association football defenders
Club Atlético River Plate footballers
Instituto footballers
Defensa y Justicia footballers
Gimnasia y Esgrima de Jujuy footballers
San Martín de San Juan footballers
Club Bolívar players
Anorthosis Famagusta F.C. players
Once Caldas footballers
All Boys footballers
Ferro Carril Oeste footballers
San Telmo footballers
Argentine Primera División players
Bolivian Primera División players
Cypriot First Division players
Categoría Primera A players
Argentine expatriate sportspeople in Bolivia
Argentine expatriate sportspeople in Cyprus
Argentine expatriate sportspeople in Colombia
Expatriate footballers in Bolivia
Expatriate footballers in Cyprus
Expatriate footballers in Colombia
Argentine football managers
All Boys managers